The Plymouth Savoy is an automobile model produced from the 1954 through 1964 model years by Plymouth.

Early history

Plymouth used the name Savoy on several automobiles. From 1951-1953, the Savoy name was used on a station wagon, upgrading the base model Suburban. Later was a line of full-sized Plymouths from 1954-1961.

Another incarnation was among Plymouth's downsized full-size cars from 1962 until 1964.

As with Plymouth's Plaza and Belvedere models, the Savoy was named after an upscale hotel, the Savoy Hotel in London.

1954

When introduced in 1954, later in the year with 1955 model paint schemes, the Savoy was Plymouth's mid-level car and priced between the base Plaza sedans and the top-line Belvedere models.
 
In 1954, the Savoy was available as a two-door Club Coupe, four-door sedan, and 2-door Club Sedan.

1955-1956

For 1955 through 1956 The Plymouth Savoy was positioned in between the low-rung Plaza and the high end Belvedere

In 1955, the Savoy was available with new power steering.

In 1956, the line added a hardtop coupe and the Custom Suburban station wagon.

In 1956, seat belts were added for safety. The Highway Hi-Fi record player was also optional.

A promotional video was produced by Chrysler, where the 1955-1956 Plymouth models were built on the assembly line at Lynch Road Assembly.

1957-1959

For the 1957 and 1958 model years, the line added a four-door hardtop sedan.

In 1959, Plymouth dropped the Plaza and replaced it with the Savoy, making the Savoy the model's entry-level full-size Plymouth. The two hardtop models were dropped, as well as the side trim and interior appointments. Sales were not diminished as the Savoy became vehicles used by taxicab companies, police departments, and other fleet customers. The model was also available to customers who were in the market for a low-cost, economical vehicle with the availability of a V8 engine and automatic transmission, and the roominess of a full-size vehicle. By 1960, a new model, the Plymouth Taxi Special, was spun off from the Savoy.

1960-1961

Plymouth models were restyled in 1960. The styling for 1961 was a year "most beholders would agree...it was hit with the ugly stick". This was because of the odd chromed "lashes" on the front.

1962-1964

Plymouth discontinued the Savoy nameplate at the end of the 1964 model year, except in Canada, where it continued through 1965.

In 1965, the full-sized entry-level Plymouth model in the U.S. was the Fury I; in Canada, it was called the Savoy but the top-level models were named Fury II and Fury III.

Other markets

The Plymouth Savoy and the Dodge Kingsway were built in India by Premier Automobiles in Kurla, Bombay.
In Mexico was assembly by Automex between 1960–1961, the car was rebadged as the Dodge Savoy. The plant was located in Lago Alberto, Mexico City.
Chrysler Australia produced the P25 series Plymouth Savoy from 1954 to 1957. An Australian developed coupe utility variant of the Savoy was produced from 1956 to 1958.

References
 Inline

General
 
 
Motor Vehicle Data Book Sanford-Evans Communications, various issues 1955-1966

External links 

Savoy
Rear-wheel-drive vehicles
Full-size vehicles
Coupés
Sedans
Station wagons
Cars introduced in 1954
1960s cars
Cars discontinued in 1964